Rudafshan (also Romanized as Rūdafshān) is a village in Abarshiveh Rural District, in the Central District of Damavand County, Tehran Province, Iran. At the 2006 census, its population was 47, in 19 families.

Tourism 
Rudafshan Cave is one of the tourist attraction near Tehran City, which is located to a village in Damavand County.

References 

Populated places in Damavand County